Bailey Road may refer to:

Bailey Road, Dhaka in Bangladesh
Bailey Road, Patna in India